Adam Chlapík  (born February 4, 1994) is a Czech professional ice hockey player. He is currently a free agent having last played with the HC Kobra Praha of the Czech 2. liga.

Chlapík previously played 24 games in the Czech Extraliga with HC Sparta Praha and HC Litvínov.

His brother Filip Chlapík is also a hockey player, currently playing within the Ottawa Senators organization in the NHL.

References

External links

1994 births
Living people
HC Benátky nad Jizerou players
Czech ice hockey forwards
HC Kobra Praha players
HC Litvínov players
HC Most players
Muskegon Lumberjacks players
Omaha Lancers players
HC Sparta Praha players
Ice hockey people from Prague
HC Stadion Litoměřice players
Tri-City Storm players
Czech expatriate ice hockey players in the United States